The Rural Municipality of Lacadena No. 228 is a rural municipality (RM) in the Canadian province of Saskatchewan within Census Division No. 8 and  Division No. 3.

History 
The RM of Lacadena No. 228 incorporated as a rural municipality on December 12, 1910.

Geography

Communities and localities 
The following urban municipalities are surrounded by the RM.

Towns
 Kyle

The following unincorporated communities are within the RM.

Organized hamlets
 White Bear

Localities
 High Point
 Lacadena
 Matador
 Mondou
 Saltburn
 Sanctuary
 Tuberose
 Tyner

Demographics 

Attractions 
 Clearwater Lake Regional Park
 Saskatchewan Landing Provincial Park
 World's Biggest Polar Bear - White Bear

Government 
The RM of Lacadena No. 228 is governed by an elected municipal council and an appointed administrator that meets on the first Tuesday of every month. The reeve of the RM is Bradley Sander while its administrator is Yvonne Nelson. The RM's office is located in Kyle.

Transportation 
 Saskatchewan Highway 4
 Saskatchewan Highway 342
 Saskatchewan Highway 647
 Kyle Airport
 Canadian National Railway

See also 
List of rural municipalities in Saskatchewan

References

External links

Lacadena